Joshua Daniel Hartnett (born July 21, 1978) is an American actor and producer. He first came to attention in 1997 for his role as Michael Fitzgerald in the television crime drama series Cracker. He made his feature film debut in 1998 in the slasher film Halloween H20: 20 Years Later, followed by teen roles in films such as the sci-fi horror film The Faculty (1998) and the drama The Virgin Suicides (1999). Hartnett had starring roles in the war film Pearl Harbor, the drama O, the war film Black Hawk Down (all 2001), the romantic comedy 40 Days and 40 Nights (2002), the crime thriller Lucky Number Slevin (2006), and other films.

He starred in the neo-noir crime thriller The Black Dahlia (2006). He next appeared in the drama Resurrecting the Champ (2007), the graphic novel–based vampire horror film 30 Days of Night (2007) and the neo-noir atmospheric thriller I Come with the Rain (2009). From 2014 to 2016, he starred as Ethan Chandler in the horror TV series Penny Dreadful, for which he was nominated for a Fangoria Chainsaw Award.

Early life
Hartnett was born in Saint Paul, Minnesota, though some sources, he has said, erroneously give San Francisco. The son of Daniel Thomas Hartnett and Wendy Anne (née Kronstedt), he was raised by his father, a building manager, and his stepmother, Molly, an artist. Hartnett was raised Roman Catholic, attending Nativity of Our Lord Catholic School.

Career
After Hartnett graduated from Minneapolis South High School in 1996, he moved to New York to attend the Conservatory of Theatre Arts & Film at SUNY Purchase, which did not go as well as he had hoped. At 19, Harnett moved to Los Angeles. Shortly after arriving, he caught an improbable break, landing a part in the short-lived but acclaimed drama Cracker, on ABC. Although the series was cancelled after sixteen episodes, Hartnett had made a name for himself. He then began to focus on feature film work. He performed in small plays and on national television commercials before being cast in his first feature film, playing the son of Jamie Lee Curtis' character in Halloween H20: 20 Years Later. Released on August 5, 1998, it performed well at the box office.

Hartnett developed a Hollywood film career, appearing in major films, including The Faculty, Black Hawk Down, Lucky Number Slevin and Pearl Harbor. He was originally scheduled to play the role of Tino in Deuces Wild, but dropped out to star in Pearl Harbor. In 2002, he starred in O, an adaptation of William Shakespeare's Othello set in an American high school, as Hugo, the film's version of Iago. In the early 2000s, Hartnett was approached several times to play the role of Clark Kent / Superman for a project originally helmed by Brett Ratner but always turned it down, not wanting to commit to a predicted ten-year role. Hartnett said of his decision, "It just wasn't the kind of movie I wanted to do. I turned down other superhero roles as well."

Hartnett was chosen as one of Teen People magazine's "21 Hottest Stars Under 21" in 1999, Teen People's "25 Hottest Stars under 25", and one of People magazine's "50 Most Beautiful People", both in 2002. He was also voted Bliss magazine's "3rd Sexiest Male", and in 2003 PETA named him the Sexiest Vegetarian Alive, as chosen by voters.

One of Hartnett's next films was the 2006 drama-mystery The Black Dahlia, in which he played a detective investigating the notorious real-life murder of waitress Elizabeth Short. Hartnett had been cast in the role five years before the film was produced, remaining committed to appearing in the movie because he liked the subject matter.

Among his 2007 roles were Resurrecting the Champ and the graphic novel-based 30 Days of Night, in which he played a small-town sheriff. Hartnett described the second film as "supernatural, but kind of a western". He was going to play trumpet player Chet Baker in the film The Prince of Cool, but did not agree with the producer's ideas and left the project.

In 2008, Hartnett played Charlie Babbit in the theatre adaptation of Barry Morrow's Academy Award-winning Rain Man at the Apollo Theatre in London's West End. He starred in the new campaign of the Emporio Armani fragrance, "Diamonds for Men", being featured in both print and TV ads for the fragrance, thus becoming the first male celebrity to represent Giorgio Armani Beauty.

He has been featured on many magazine covers, such as Cosmogirl, Details, Entertainment Weekly, Girlfriend, Seventeen, Vanity Fair, GQ and Vman, in addition to being in other magazines like Vogue, ELLE, People, Glamour, In Touch and InStyle.

In 2009, Hartnett produced the video clip for the rapper Kid Cudi's song "Pursuit of Happiness”.

In 2013, Hartnett was a guest of honor on Off Plus Camera.

In 2014, he was cast in the part of Ethan Chandler in the Gothic horror series Penny Dreadful, shot in locations around Dublin and Ireland. Later Hartnett's character was revealed to be Lawrence Talbot / the Wolfman, who had changed his name to distance himself from his family.

Hartnett starred in Guy Ritchie's 2021 revenge drama film Wrath of Man in a supporting role before Ritchie cast him in his upcoming film Operation Fortune: Ruse de Guerre. In January 2022, Hartnett was cast as Ernest Lawrence in Christopher Nolan's upcoming film Oppenheimer. In July 2022, he joined sixth season of Black Mirror.

Activism
Hartnett has been involved in various causes. In 2007, he took time out from filming to support the green lifestyle campaign of Global Cool.

In 2011, Hartnett became one of a handful of celebrities attached to USAID and Ad Council's FWD campaign, an awareness initiative tied to that year's East Africa drought. He joined Uma Thurman, Chanel Iman and Geena Davis in TV and Internet ads to "forward the facts" about the crisis.

In 2012, Hartnett also joined Barack Obama in his campaign in Minnesota, appearing at such events as the Minnesota Greater Together Youth Summit before formally endorsing the President on the official campaign YouTube channel. He along with Minneapolis Mayor RT Rybak also appeared at the University of Minnesota's McNamara Alumni Center for an Obama Q&A in April.

Personal life
Hartnett began a relationship with English actress Tamsin Egerton in 2012. They have a daughter (born 2015), a second child (born 2017), and a third child (born 2019). In 2022, he revealed he had married Egerton in November 2021.

Regarding fame, Hartnett has said, "I know what it's like to be in that whole world. I was up there for a couple of years, and it was uncomfortable. I think trying to stay at the top is a shortcut to unhappiness." Hartnett took a 15-month break from acting, saying "I spent a bit of time really thinking about whether this was the right thing for me."

Filmography

Actor

Awards and nominations
2010: Won – Ischia International Arts Academy Acting Award / Ischia Global Film & Music Fest, Italy
2009: Won – Outstanding Environmentalist / 21st Century Leaders Awards, Qatar
2007: Won – GQ Männer des Jahres (GQ Men of the Year) / GQ magazine, Germany
2002:  Won – ShoWest Award Male Star of Tomorrow / ShoWest Convention, USA

References

Further reading

External links
 
 

1978 births
20th-century American male actors
21st-century American male actors
American environmentalists
American expatriates in England
American humanitarians
American male film actors
American male stage actors
American male television actors
Film producers from Minnesota
Film producers from New York (state)
Living people
Male actors from Saint Paul, Minnesota
South High School (Minnesota) alumni
State University of New York at Purchase alumni